Innovation Unit is a not-for-profit social enterprise with the stated aim of using innovation to create different, better, lower cost public services that better meet social challenges. It was founded as a part of what is now the Department for Education (DfE), but has been an independent organisation since 2006.

History
Innovation Unit was established in June 2002 at the Department for Education and Skills – now the DfE – as part of the measures in the White Paper 'Schools – Achieving Success' which followed the Education Act 2002.
Between 2002 and 2006 the remit was focused on education and children's services. The first phase of the work concentrated on responding to innovative ideas that were sent into the Government, mainly by teachers and head teachers. It funded a number of these and provided advice and practical support for many others. Alongside other innovative small-scale projects, it worked on several large-scale programmes, such as the Leading Edge Partnership programme and Teachers TV.

Between 2003 and 2008, Innovation Unit advised on The Power to Innovate, a piece of legislation which enabled schools and Local Authorities to apply to the Secretary of State to have regulations lifted if a strong case could be made that they were getting in the way of raising standards in education. It also played an active role in supporting and sponsoring the National Teacher Research Panel, The Research Informed Practice Site and the Teaching Awards.

Since 2006 Innovation Unit has been independent of government and receives no grant funding. It consists of a team of partners and senior associates, as well as a team of core staff based at offices in Old Street, London. Its former Board member includes David Albury, formerly a principal advisor at the Prime Minister's Strategy Unit during Tony Blair's premiership.

Innovation Unit works independently across the UK, Australia and New Zealand. Clients range from local authorities and government departments, to charities and foundations. The organisation currently works across five key areas of impact: healthy lives, mental health, early years, schools and learning, and children's social care.

Publications
Reducing health inequalities - the challenge of public health by John Craig

Redesigning Education: Shaping learning systems around the globe

Learning a Living: Radical innovation for education in work by Valerie Hannon, Sarah Gillinson and Leonie Shanks

With Nesta:

People Powered Health: Health for people, by people and with people by Matthew Horne, Halima Khan and Paul Corrigan

By Us, For Us: the power of co-design and co-delivery by Katharine Langford, Martha Hampson, Julie Temperley and Peter Baeck

People Helping People: peer support that changes lives by Katharine Langford, Martha Hampson, Julie Temperley and Peter Baeck

Networks that Work: Partnerships for integrated care and services by Katharine Langford, Martha Hampson, Julie Temperley and Peter Baeck

Redefining Consultations: changing the relationships at the heart of health by Katharine Langford, Martha Hampson, Julie Temperley and Peter Baeck

People Powered Commissioning: embedding innovation in practice by Paul Corrigan, Georgina Craig and Martha Hampson.

References

External links
Innovation Unit

Non-profit organisations based in the United Kingdom
Education in England
Think tanks established in 2006
2002 establishments in England
Public policy think tanks based in the United Kingdom
Government agencies established in 2002
Innovation in the United Kingdom